Oda Helen Sletnes (born 10 February 1953) is a Norwegian diplomat.

She was born in Trondheim, and studied architecture at the Norwegian Institute of Technology. She started working for the Norwegian Ministry of Foreign Affairs in 1981. She served in the Norwegian European Union delegation in Brussels from 1997 to 2001. After a period as deputy under-secretary of state in the Ministry of Foreign Affairs from 2003 to 2006, she was the Norwegian ambassador to the European Union from 2006 to 2011. In 2011 she was appointed as a college president of the European Free Trade Association Surveillance Authority, a position she held until 2015. She is since October 2015 the Norwegian ambassador to the European Union.

She is decorated as a Commander of the Royal Norwegian Order of Merit (2007), Grand Knight of the Order of the Falcon (1997) and Grand Officer of the Order of Merit of the Italian Republic (2004).

She is now the new Norwegian Ambassador in France, since early 2019.

References

1953 births
Living people
Norwegian civil servants
Ambassadors of Norway to the European Union
Ambassadors of Norway to France
Grand Knights of the Order of the Falcon
Grand Officers of the Order of Merit of the Italian Republic
Norwegian women ambassadors
People from Trondheim